Simon Rubinstein (c. 1910–1942) was an Austrian chess master. He participated several times in the Leopold Trebitsch Memorial Tournament in Vienna; took 12th in 1932 (Albert Becker won), tied for 11–12th in 1933 (Ernst Grünfeld and Hans Müller won), tied for 6–7th in 1936 (Henryk Friedman won), and took 2nd, behind Lajos Steiner, in 1937/38. He died in a concentration camp in 1942.

References

External links

Chessmetrics Player Profile :: Simon Rubinstein

1910s births
1942 deaths
Austrian chess players
Jewish chess players
Austrian Jews
20th-century chess players
Austrian Jews who died in the Holocaust
Austrian civilians killed in World War II
Austrian people who died in Nazi concentration camps